Hasselbach may refer to:

Places
 Hasselbach, Altenkirchen, Rhineland-Palatinate, Germany
 Hasselbach, Rhein-Hunsrück, Rhineland-Palatinate, Germany

Rivers
 Hasselbach (Dalke), North Rhine-Westphalia, Germany, tributary of the Dalke
 Hasselbach (Werre), North Rhine-Westphalia, Germany, tributary of the Werre
 Hasselbach (Dürre Holzminde), Lower Saxony, Germany, tributary of the Dürre Holzminde

Other uses
 Hasselbach (surname)